= Jackson W. Tarver =

American publisher (1917–1999)

Jackson Williams Tarver Sr. (March 2, 1917 – March 22, 1999) was a publisher in Atlanta. He published the Atlanta Journal-Constitution in the 1960s and was Chairman of the Associated Press from 1977 to 1983. Mercer University awards a scholarship in his honor. He was also an executive at Cox Enterprises.

He was born in Savannah, Georgia.
